Elazığ Archaeology and Ethnography Museum is a museum in Elazığ, Turkey

In 1965 a museum was established in a historical building in Harput, a former settlement  to the east of Elazığ. During the construction of two hydro electric plants; Keban Dam and Karakaya Dam both of which are on Fırat River (Euphrates of the antiquity) and quite close to Elazığ, many items worthy of museum were found. With these finds a new museum was established in the university campus
. It was opened on 28 July 1982.

There are two exhibition halls and a gallery; archaeology and coin section, ethnographical section carpet and rug gallery. There are also 12 office rooms, a laboratory and a conference hall.

The items are from Paleolithic, Neolithic, Chalcolithic, Bronze (Hittites, Hurrians) Iron , Urartu, Hellenistic, Roman, Byzantine, Seljukids and Ottoman ages. Also in the yard there are tombstones from Tunceli Province.

References

Buildings and structures in Elazığ Province
Archaeological museums in Turkey
Ethnographic museums in Turkey
1982 establishments in Turkey
Tourist attractions in Elazığ Province
Museums established in 1982